Sierra de San Pedro Mártir (Kiliwa: ʔxaal haq) is a mountain range located within southern Ensenada Municipality and southern Baja California state, of northwestern Mexico.

It is a major mountain range in the long Peninsular Ranges System, that extends from Southern California down the Baja California Peninsula into Baja California Sur state.

Geography
Also known as Cerro de la Encantada (Enchanted Mountain) and Picacho la Providencia (Providence Peak), it is the highest point in Baja California state and of the entire Baja California Peninsula.

The range is a drainage divide that demarcates the drainages flowing west into the Pacific Ocean or east into the Gulf of California for this section of the Baja California Peninsula. Snow is usually present at the highest elevations in the winter.

The Sierra de Juárez are on the north, and Sierra de San Francisco are on the south, both are also part of the Peninsular Ranges System.

Features
Parque Nacional Sierra de San Pedro Mártir
It was established by presidential decree in 1974, and the first of two national parks to be established on the Baja California Peninsula. The second is Parque Nacional Constitución de 1857 to the north, in the Sierra de Juárez and also in Baja California state.

National Astronomical Observatory
The astronomical complex was built in 1975. The observatory's site takes advantage of the high elevation, along with typically clear skies, low relative humidity, low atmospheric pollution, low light pollution, and low levels of radio interference.

The range was a site considered for construction of the Thirty Meter Telescope, now tentatively planned for a controversial site on Mauna Kea in Hawaii.

Ecology

Flora
Sierra de San Pedro Mártir has a very similar flora to the Sierra de Juárez on the north. Higher elevations have Sierra Juarez and San Pedro Martir pine-oak forests ecoregion flora, which are surrounded at lower elevations by California chaparral and woodlands ecoregion flora, and at lowest elevations by the Baja California Desert ecoregion flora.

The flora is distinct from that of 'mainland' Mexico across the Gulf of California to the east, and shares many species with the Laguna Mountains and Cuyamaca Mountains, also Peninsular Ranges, in San Diego County, California. Typical conifer species include white fir, sugar pine and Jeffrey pine. The canyons of the lower eastern Sierra de Pedro Mártir are the southern range demarcation of natural California fan palm (Washingtonia filifera) distribution. Arizona cypress (Cupressus arizonica) can be found with Canyon live oaks (Quercus chrysolepis) and California fan palms.

Fauna
Baja California rainbow trout (Oncorhynchus mykiss nelsoni) are native to the headwaters of Rio Santo Domingo in the Sierra San Pedro Martir. Desert bighorn sheep also live in the range

California condors, zoo-bred from the San Diego Zoo Safari Park condor program, were reintroduced into the Sierra San Pedro Martir in 1987, the first time seen in the range since 1937. Each year, a small group of young California condors are selected from the pool of birds being bred by the Los Angeles Zoo, San Diego Zoo Safari Park, Oregon Zoo, and The Peregrine Fund for release to the wild. Annual releases range from four to seven zoo-bred birds.

See also
 
 
 
 Sierra Juarez and San Pedro Martir pine-oak forests ecoregion

References

External links

 Official  Parque Nacional Sierra de San Pedro Mártir website—
 National Astronomical Observatory website—
 Rancho Meling, 100 años de tradición—

San Pedro Mártir
Peninsular Ranges
Geography of Ensenada Municipality